Derek Asamoah (born 1 May 1981) is a Ghanaian professional footballer who plays as a forward. He has previously played for clubs in England, France, Scotland, Bulgaria and South Korea.

Club career

Early career
Asamoah learned his trade in the Protec Football Academy in North London. Whilst in the academy, he played for semi-professional side Hampton & Richmond Borough, before moving to Slough Town in 2001.

Asamoah then gained a trial at Northampton Town, in which he signed his first professional contract. After an impressive first season at Sixfields, he was offered a new improved contract but Asamoah turned it down in favor of a move to Mansfield Town. He had a difficult time at Mansfield Town and fell out with manager Carlton Palmer. He was transfer-listed and moved to Lincoln City.

Asamoah struggled to enjoy his spell at Lincoln City and scored very few goals, which led to boss Keith Alexander loaning him out to struggling Chester City.

Asamoah was in his most prolific season yet, almost using his own two feet saving Chester from the drop with nine goals in 18 matches and at one stage in the season, he had seven goals in four matches. Having rejected a permanent deal with Chester, Asamoah left and was released by Lincoln City.

In search of a new club, Asamoah trialled with both Doncaster Rovers and Scunthorpe United during July 2006, but on 3 August 2006, Shrewsbury Town announced that he had signed for them and turned down Scunthorpe United.

In 2006–07, Asamoah netted 10 times in the league as Shrewsbury Town qualified for the League Two play-offs in 7th place.

Nice
In August 2007, Asamoah moved to French Ligue 1 side OGC Nice in a controversial transfer, where he went AWOL from Shrewsbury Town in order to sign with the French club, with no clearance from Shrewsbury, the FA or the Football League. Asamoah moved for a figure of £50,000.

Following the transfer, Shrewsbury manager Gary Peters claimed Asamoah's conduct was that of a 'selfish player and a selfish person', and revealed Asamoah would have been sacked by Shrewsbury Town had his deal with Nice fallen through.

He never made a first-team appearance for the club. As a result of this, he had not played domestic football in over 18-months by end of January 2009, when he left Nice to begin training with Yeovil Town.

Hamilton Academical
On 2 April 2009, it was confirmed that he had a trial at Scottish side Hamilton Academical becoming the third Shrewsbury Town player to feature on their books after Colin Cramb and cult hero Victor Kasule. Asamoah made his debut for the Scottish side against Celtic, in a 6–0 thumping. At the end of the season Asamoah decided change would be best for him and left Hamilton for Bulgaria.

Lokomotiv Sofia
In July 2009, Asamoah joined Lokomotiv Sofia for two years, with the option for an additional one.

Pohang Steelers
In November 2010, Asamoah signed with South Korean side Pohang Steelers. His contract was for three years. On 5 March 2011, he made his official debut (as a starter) in the 1–1 home draw with Seongnam Ilhwa Chunma. Asamoah netted his first goal on 13 March 2011 – in the 1–0 away win over Chunnam Dragons. He established himself as an influential player for the side.

Daegu FC
Despite being one of Pohang Steeler's top goalscorers, Asamoah left them as a Free Agent and on 20 February 2013 signed with Daegu FC.

Carlisle United
Asamoah signed for League Two club Carlisle United on a short-term deal on 21 October 2014. He scored on his debut in a 4–3 home defeat to Burton Albion two days later. On 4 February, he signed a contract to keep him at Brunton Park until the end of the season. He described the club as a "sleeping giant" and hopes to help guide the Cumbrians back towards the top of the European game.

On 23 September 2015, in a Football League Cup tie against Liverpool, Asamoah scored the second goal of the match, with the match ending 1–1 before extra time. Carlisle United lost the tie eventually on penalties in a 3–2 result.

He was released June 2016, but in September he returned to the club for training. After scoring a hat trick in a reserve game, Asamoah resigned for the club on 14 October 2016 on a short-term deal. After making 11 appearances in all competitions, Asamoah was released by Carlisle on 16 January 2017.

Guiseley
On 20 January 2017,  Asamoah signed for National League side Guiseley until the end of the season. He left the club again in the summer 2017.

Cheshunt
In 2020 Asamoah joined Cheshunt where his son also plays.

International career
In October 2006, Asamoah was included in the Ghana national football team for friendlies against Japan and South Korea, in which he made his international debut, he has made another three appearances for Ghana, looking to gain a place in the Milovan Rajevac squad for the 2010 African Cup of Nations and the World Cup. During the winter transfer window pause, the Ghana coach announced that having many talented footballers in his team, he would eye him to be included in the squad for the Cup, seeing as many Lokomotiv Sofia games as possible.

On 7 November 2011, Asamoah returned to the national team again for the first time since 2008. He was recalled to the national team for friendlies against Gabon and Sierra Leone by new head coach Goran Stevanović. On 15 November 2011, Asamoah scored his first international goal against Gabon in stoppage time to win the game 2–1 for Ghana.

International goals

Personal life
Asamoah is the cousin of former professional footballer Lloyd Owusu, who has now retired. Asamoah's son, Maleace is also a professional footballer and the pair played together in a match for Cheshunt.

References

External links
 

Living people
1981 births
Footballers from Accra
Association football forwards
Ghanaian footballers
Ghana international footballers
English Football League players
Scottish Premier League players
First Professional Football League (Bulgaria) players
K League 1 players
Hampton & Richmond Borough F.C. players
Slough Town F.C. players
Northampton Town F.C. players
Mansfield Town F.C. players
Lincoln City F.C. players
Chester City F.C. players
Shrewsbury Town F.C. players
OGC Nice players
Hamilton Academical F.C. players
FC Lokomotiv 1929 Sofia players
Pohang Steelers players
Daegu FC players
Carlisle United F.C. players
Expatriate footballers in England
Expatriate footballers in France
Expatriate footballers in Scotland
Expatriate footballers in Bulgaria
Expatriate footballers in South Korea
Ghanaian expatriate footballers
Ghanaian expatriate sportspeople in France
Ghanaian expatriate sportspeople in England
Ghanaian expatriate sportspeople in Bulgaria
Ghanaian expatriate sportspeople in South Korea
Ghanaian expatriate sportspeople in Scotland